Historia Norwegiæ is a short history of Norway written in Latin by an anonymous monk. The only extant manuscript is in the private possession of the Earl of Dalhousie, and is now kept in the National Records of Scotland in Edinburgh. The manuscript contains several other texts; the Historia itself is in folios 1r-12r. Recent dating efforts place it somewhere c. 1500-1510A.

The original text was written several centuries earlier than the manuscript itself; the text refers to both a volcanic eruption and an earthquake in 1211 as contemporary events, and Orkney is stated to be under Norwegian rule.

Contents 

Historia Norwegiæ consists of three parts:

 I. A short geographical survey of Norway and its dominions, followed by a brief history of Norway
 II. Genealogy of the Earls of Orkney
 III. Catalogue of the Kings of Norway

Notable 

One of Historia Norwegiæ's important features is a Latin translation of an independent version of Þjóðólfr of Hvinir's skaldic poem Ynglingatal. Besides that text, there is the Ynglinga saga in Snorri Sturluson's Heimskringla. The text also contains ethnographic details, including a description of a shamanic séance among the Sami people. It is the earliest preserved written source for many of its historical details.

Dates 

Along with Ágrip af Nóregskonungasögum and the work of Theodoricus monachus, Historia Norwegiæ is considered one of the Norwegian synoptic histories, and is thought to have been written, at the earliest, sometime between 1160 and 1175AD. This dating, however, is under debate and 1220AD may be more accurate. The text may have been composed somewhere in eastern Norway.

The manuscript was published by Peter Andreas Munch in 1850 as Symbolæ ad Historiam Antiquiorem Rerum Norwegicarum. The standard edition was that of Storm (1880) for many years, and the first English translation was done by Kunin and Phelpstead (2001). A new critical edition and translation appeared in 2003.

References

Sources 
 Ekrem, Inger (editor), Lars Boje Mortensen (editor) and Peter Fisher (translator) (2003). Historia Norwegie. Museum Tusculanum Press. 
 
 Storia della Norvegia. Historia Norwegie (XII sec.), Italian transl. with parallel Latin text, ed. Piero Bugiani, Vocifuoriscena, Viterbo 2017.
 Storm, Gustav (editor) (1880). Monumenta historica Norwegiæ: Latinske kildeskrifter til Norges historie i middelalderen, Monumenta Historica Norwegiae (Kristiania: Brøgger)
 Nordisk familjebok 
 Notes and Queries, Issue 56

External links 
 Historia Norvegiae in English Translation and notes by Kunin and Phelpstead (2001).

12th-century history books
12th-century Latin books
History books about Norway
Kings' sagas
Medieval Latin historical texts
Norwegian manuscripts